The women's team pursuit competition of the cycling events at the 2015 Pan American Games was held on July 16 and 17 at the Milton Velodrome in Milton, Ontario.

Schedule
All times are Eastern Standard Time (UTC−3).

Results
8 teams of four competitors competed. The top two teams will race for gold, while third and fourth race for the bronze medals.

Qualification

First Round

Finals

María Luisa Calle was disqualified to testing positive for steroids.

References

Track cycling at the 2015 Pan American Games
Women's team pursuit (track cycling)
Pan